Karlijn Swinkels (born 28 October 1998) is a Dutch road cyclist, who currently rides for UCI Women's Continental Team .

As a junior, she competed at 2015 UCI Road World Championships in the women's junior road race (15th) and at the 2016 European Road Championships in both the junior time trial (6th) and road race (33rd). At the 2016 UCI Road World Championships she became world champion in the women's junior time trial event.

Major results

2015
 National Junior Road Championships
3rd Road race
3rd Time trial
 3rd National Junior Cyclo–cross Championships
2016
 1st  Time trial, UCI World Junior Road Championships
 2nd Time trial, National Junior Road Championships
 2nd Overall Albstadt-Frauen-Etappenrennen
 3rd Overall Energiewacht Tour Juniors
 6th Time trial, UEC European Junior Road Championships
 10th Gent–Wevelgem Juniors
2018
 7th Time trial, UEC European Under–23 Road Championships
 10th Team time trial, UCI World Road Championships
2019
 1st Stage 1 Vuelta a Burgos Feminas
 9th Postnord UCI WWT Vårgårda WestSweden TTT
2020
 5th Grand Prix International d'Isbergues
 7th Time trial, UEC European Under–23 Road Championships
2021
 3rd Road race, National Road Championships
 4th Overall Festival Elsy Jacobs
2022
 6th Overall Grand Prix Elsy Jacobs
 10th Dwars door Vlaanderen

References

External links

1998 births
Living people
Dutch female cyclists
People from Gemert-Bakel
Cyclists from North Brabant
21st-century Dutch women